The Diocese of Terni-Narni-Amelia is a Latin Church ecclesiastical territory or diocese of the Catholic Church in Umbria, central Italy. It was  created in 1983, when the Diocese of Amelia was united with the Diocese of Terni and Narni. The latter had been in turn created in 1907, when the Diocese of Narni was united to the historical Diocese of Terni. The diocese is immediately exempt to the Holy See, not part of any ecclesiastical province.

History 
Terni is the ancient Interamna Nahars of the Umbrians, and the cathedral, and other churches, are built on the sites of pagan temples. After the Lombard invasion, Terni belonged to the Duchy of Spoleto, and with the latter, came into the Pontifical States. It was at Terni that Pope Zacharias entered into the agreement with King Luitprand for the restitution of the cities of Bieda, Orte, Bomarzo, and Amelia to the Duchy of Rome.

It is believed that the gospel was preached at Terni by Saint Peregrinus, about the middle of the second century. Saint Valentinus has a basilica outside the city. There were other martyrs from this city, among them saints Proculus, Ephebus, Apollonius, and the holy virgin Agape.

In the time of Totila, the Bishop of Terni, Saint Proculus, was killed at Bologna, and Saint Domnina and ten nuns, her companions, were put to death at Terni itself. After the eighth century Terni was without a bishop until 1217, in which year the diocese was re-established.

Among its bishops were:

Ludovico Mazzanco III (1406), who governed the diocese for fifty-two years;
Francesco Coppini (1458–1462), papal legate to England during the Wars of the Roses
Cosmas Manucci (1625), who gave the high altar to the cathedral;
Francesco Rapaccioli (1646), a cardinal who restored the cathedral.
Franco Gualdrini (1983–2000)
Vincenzo Paglia  (2000–2012)
Giuseppe Piemontese (2014–present)

Among its saints:
 Saint Valentine (176–273), the third bishop of Terni 197–273. A friend and protector of those in love.
 Blessed Lucy of Narni (1476–1544), spiritual adviser to the Duke of Ferrara, Ercole I d'Este, 1499–1505.

Ordinaries

Diocese of Terni
Latin Name: Interamnensis
Erected: 2nd Century
...

Diocese of Terni e Narni
Latin Name: Interamnensis et Narniensis
United: 12 April 1907 with the Diocese of Narni
Immediately Subject to the Holy See

Francesco Moretti (12 Apr 1907 – 7 Mar 1921 Resigned)
Cesare Boccoleri (13 Jun 1921 – 28 Mar 1940 Appointed, Archbishop of Modena e Nonantola)
Felice Bonomini (28 Aug 1940 – 21 Nov 1947 Appointed, Bishop of Como)
Giovanni Battista Dal Prà (6 Apr 1948 – 10 Feb 1973 Resigned)
Santo Bartolomeo Quadri (10 Feb 1973 – 31 May 1983 Appointed, Archbishop of Modena e Nonantola)

Diocese of Terni, Narni, e Amelia
Latin Name: Interamnensis, Narniensis et Amerinus
United: 13 September 1983 with the Diocese of Amelia
	
Franco Gualdrini (14 Sep 1983 – 4 Mar 2000 Retired)

Diocese of Terni-Narni-Amelia
Latin Name: Interamnensis-Narniensis-Amerinus
Name Changed: 30 September 1986

Vincenzo Paglia (4 Mar 2000 – 26 Jun 2012 Appointed, President of the Pontifical Council for the Family)
Ernesto Vecchi, Apostolic Administrator (2 February 2013 – 21 June 2014)
Giuseppe Piemontese, O.F.M. Conv. (16 Apr 2014 – 29 Oct 2021 Retired)
 Francesco Antonio Soddu (29 Oct 2021 -)

Notes

External links 
 GigaCatholic

Terni
Terni
Terni